John Stanley Edgar  (26 December 1950 – 3 April 2021) was a New Zealand sculptor and medallist.

Early life and education
Born in Auckland on 26 December 1950, Edgar was educated at Mount Albert Grammar School and then the University of New South Wales. He then worked as a research chemist and as a prospector before turning to sculpture.

Sculptural work
As a sculptor, Edgar worked chiefly in hard stone, and occasionally in other materials, such as glass or copper.

In 2000, he designed McLeod's Crossing, a pedestrian bridge over the Oratia Stream in Falls Park, Henderson, commissioned by Waitakere City Council. Since 2004, a public commission, Transformer, has been part of the sculpture walk in the Auckland Domain. Another work, Lie of the Land, was installed in the Savill Garden, in Windsor Great Park in England, in 2012. His works are also in a number of public collections, including Auckland Council, Christchurch Art Gallery, Corning Museum of Glass (USA), the Museum of New Zealand Te Papa Tongarewa and the National Museum of Australia.

Edgar designed the Icon award medal for the Arts Foundation of New Zealand, and the medal awarded to Companions of Auckland War Memorial Museum. The latter is made from "two New Zealand argillites (pakohe) from the South Island bound together with aluminium". He also illustrated books of poetry by Dinah Hawken.

Honours and awards 
Edgar was appointed an Officer of the New Zealand Order of Merit in the 2009 New Year Honours, for services to art, in particular sculpture.

Other activities
Edgar lived in Karekare, and served as president of the Waitakere Ranges Protection Society since 1998. He was made a life member of the society in 2005.

Death
He died in Auckland on 3 April 2021.

References

Further reading

External links 
 
 Works at Trish Clark Gallery
 Works at Masterworks Gallery
 Works at Milford Galleries
 Jewellery by Edgar

1950 births
2021 deaths
Artists from Auckland
21st-century New Zealand sculptors
21st-century New Zealand male artists
20th-century New Zealand sculptors
20th-century New Zealand male artists
Officers of the New Zealand Order of Merit
Medallists
People educated at Mount Albert Grammar School
University of New South Wales alumni
New Zealand chemists